Miazzina is a comune (municipality) in the Province of Verbano-Cusio-Ossola in the Italian region Piedmont, located about  northeast of Turin and about  northeast of Verbania.

Miazzina borders the following municipalities: Aurano, Cambiasca, Caprezzo, Cossogno, Gurro, Intragna, Valle Cannobina, Verbania.

Demographic evolution

References

Cities and towns in Piedmont